The 2019 RBC Tennis Championships of Dallas was a professional tennis tournament played on hard courts. It was the 22nd edition of the tournament and part of the 2019 ATP Challenger Tour. It took place in Dallas, United States between 4 and 10 February 2019.

Singles main-draw entrants

Seeds

 1 Rankings are as of January 28, 2019.

Other entrants
The following players received wildcards into the singles main draw:
  Harrison Adams
  William Blumberg
  Evan King
  Alex Rybakov
  Evan Zhu

The following players received entry into the singles main draw using their ITF World Tennis Ranking:
  Matías Franco Descotte
  Jelle Sels
  João Souza
  Louis Wessels

The following players received entry from the qualifying draw:
  Gijs Brouwer
  Maxime Cressy

The following players received entry as lucky losers:
  Emilio Gómez
  Martin Redlicki

Champions

Singles

 Mitchell Krueger def.  Mackenzie McDonald 4–6, 7–6(7–3), 6–1.

Doubles

 Marcos Giron /  Dennis Novikov def.  Ante Pavić /  Ruan Roelofse 6–4, 7–6(7–3).

External links
Official Website 

2019 ATP Challenger Tour
2019
2019 in American tennis
2019 in sports in Texas
February 2019 sports events in the United States